The Autism MX Project (AMX) is a nonprofit 501(C)(3) organization based in Temecula, California that raises autism awareness through professional and local MX racers and provides children with autism and their families a protected environment to experience motocross. Founded in 2010 by lifelong motocross enthusiast Mathew Dalton, the father of an autistic son, the project began with the 501 sponsorship from the Temecula-based Our Nicholas Foundation. Southern Californian children with autism may attend day camps at MX tracks where small 50cc dirt bikes and 50cc quads are provided for their supervised use. 

They raise awareness through the dozens of racers participating in Team Autism MX, who display the autism awareness puzzle logo.

References

External links 
 
Autism
Charitable organization

Mental health organizations in California
Temecula, California
Organizations established in 2010
Motocross
Autism-related organizations in the United States
2010 establishments in California